KMRK-FM (96.1 FM, "MY Country 96.1") is a radio station that serves the Midland–Odessa metropolitan area with country music. The station is owned by  ICA Communications, who acquired this station and its sister stations for $3 million in 2010 from Gap Broadcasting. Gap had acquired the many stations, including this one, from Clear Channel Communications in 2007. One of the first announcements was that KMRK would broadcast the Midland RockHounds' entire 2010 season.

Its studios are located at the ICA Business Plaza on East Eighth Street in Odessa, just east of downtown, and its transmitter is located in Gardendale, Texas.

History
This station was a Tejano outlet from 1993 until it flipped to Rhythmic contemporary in 2000 as "WiLD 96.1." On July 31, 2008, KMRK flipped to Country and adopted the moniker "My 96.1 Country."

References

External links
KMRK-FM official website

MRK-FM
Radio stations established in 1991